Altruistic suicide is the sacrifice of one's life in order to save or benefit others, for the good of the group, or to preserve the traditions and honor of a society. It is always intentional. Benevolent suicide refers to the self sacrifice of one's own life for the sake of the greater good. Such a sacrifice may be performed for the sake of executing a particular action, or for the sake of keeping a natural balance in the society. 

Altruistic suicide was seen by Émile Durkheim in his book Suicide: A Study In Sociology as the product of over-integration with society.  Real-life examples in his book include "a soldier choosing to go to war for his family/community/country". However, this type of categorization remained controversial, as it downplayed the valor of such actions. According to Durkheim, altruistic suicide contrasts with egoistic suicide, fatalistic suicide, and anomic suicide.

In contrast, a "sacrifice" which is committed by the force of a state is referred to as eugenics or mass murder, but may be otherwise referred to as "enforced population limits" or "population control". In literature, examples may promote the concept as a means for ending enduring types of social conflict, or else deride the concept as an example of a dystopian future society.

Rituals
If a person willingly ends his or her own life, it is not necessarily considered a tragic death. Émile Durkheim notes that in some cultures there is a duty to intentionally commit ritual suicide. 

A Japanese samurai intentionally ends life (seppuku) to preserve honor and to avoid disgrace. Indian, Japanese, and other widows have participated in an end-of-life ritual suicide after the death of a husband, although Westernized populations have abandoned this practice. The Indian practice of widow suicide is called sati, and often entails the widow lying down on her husband’s funeral pyre in an act of self-immolation. The elderly members of certain cultures intentionally ended their lives, in what is termed as senicide. In hunter-gatherer societies, death "was determined for the elderly ... normally characterized by a liminal period and ceremonies in which the old person was transferred from the present world to the next." 

Durkheim also observes that altruistic suicide is unlikely to occur much in contemporary Western society where "individual personality is increasingly freed from the collective personality". Altruistic suicide has been described as an evolutionarily stable strategy. Altruistic suicide has a long history in India, even being noted in the Dharmashastras. Some perceive self-immolation as an altruistic or "worthy" suicide.

Emergencies
In contemporary Western society, this is seldom referred to as suicide, and most often referred to as an act of heroism. This only exists in times of emergency, and is always lauded, and is perceived as a tragic death.

Self-sacrificial acts of heroism, such as falling on a grenade, is one example.  Intentionally remaining on the deck of a sinking ship to leave room in the life rafts, intentionally ending one's life to preserve the resources of a group in the face of deprivation and the like are suicidal acts of heroism. Firefighters, law-enforcement individuals, undercover agents, sailors, and soldiers more often are at risk of opportunities for this form of unplanned self-sacrifice. These are all a result of tragic, life-threatening, emergencies. It is only an emergency measure, a voluntary but unwanted end to the person's life. It is never a result of long-term planned action, yet may involve some short-term planning.  Examples of this include Vince Coleman, a telegraph operator who saved hundreds of lives by sending out a warning about an imminent explosion.

Protests

Thailand
Nuamthong Praiwan, a taxi driver who attempted suicide, drove his taxi into a tank in protest after the military coup of 2006. He was later found hanging from a pedestrian footbridge. Officials found a suicide note and later ruled his death a suicide.

In 2020, Khanakorn Pianchana, a Thai judge committed suicide to protest the Thai justice system. He made a suicide attempt in October 2019, Khanakorn shot himself in the chest with a pistol in the Yala province court, after he acquitted five men on murder and firearms charges due to lack of evidence and reading a short statement, in order to protest against interference in the justice system. He died in a second attempt in March 2020, after being subject to investigations following his actions.

Vietnam 
In 1963, Vietnamese monk Thich Quang Duc committed altruistic suicide through the means of self-immolation. He did this to protest the treatment of Buddhist practicing peoples by the South Vietnamese government.

See also
 Advocacy of suicide
 Altruism
 Cadmean victory
 Half a Life (Star Trek: The Next Generation)
 HMS Birkenhead (1845)
 Human shield
 Martyr
 Pyrrhic victory
 Revolutionary Suicide
 Self-denial
 Self-sacrifice in Jewish law
 Utilitarianism

References

Suicide types
Émile Durkheim
Concepts in ethics